María Tost Forrellat (born 21 March 1994) is a field hockey player from Spain, who plays as a forward.

Career

Club hockey
Tost plays hockey for Club Egara in the División de Honor in Spain, and has previously represented Mannheimer HC in the German Bundesliga.

National teams

Under–21
In 2013, Tost was a member of the Spanish Under–21 team at the FIH Junior World Cup in Mönchengladbach.

She followed this up with an appearance at the 2014 EuroHockey Junior Championship in Waterloo where the team finished fourth.

Red Sticks
Tost made her debut for the Spanish national team, the 'Red Sticks', in 2014.

2019 was Tost's most prominent year with the national side, winning her first medal with the team at the FIH Series Finals in Valencia, taking home gold. This was followed up with a bronze medal performance at the EuroHockey Championships in Antwerp.

References

External links
 
 

1994 births
Living people
Female field hockey forwards
Spanish female field hockey players